Jessica Boevers (born August 25, 1972) is an American actress who has appeared in a number of Broadway productions,  Off-Broadway productions, films, and television.

Early life
Boevers attended the University of Cincinnati College-Conservatory of Music, graduating in 1994.

Career 
Boevers' Broadway credits include Les Misérables (Eponine), A Funny Thing Happened on the Way to the Forum (Philia) Rent (Maureen), Oklahoma! (Ado Annie), and In My Life (Jenny).

In addition, she has appeared on the television shows Strangers with Candy and Another World, and the 1993 film Airborne.

Boevers works at The Masters School in Dobbs Ferry, New York.

External links

References 

1972 births
Living people
University of Cincinnati – College-Conservatory of Music alumni
American stage actresses
American film actresses
American television actresses
21st-century American women